Dasanglu Pul is a Bharatiya Janata Party politician from Arunachal Pradesh. She has been elected in Arunachal Pradesh Legislative Assembly election in 2016 from Hayuliang. She was wife of Kalikho Pul, former Chief Minister of the north-eastern state of Arunachal Pradesh for a brief time in 2016.

References 

People from Hawai, Arunachal Pradesh
Arunachal Pradesh MLAs 2019–2024
Arunachal Pradesh MLAs 2014–2019
Living people
Bharatiya Janata Party politicians from Arunachal Pradesh
Year of birth missing (living people)